KGRN (1410 AM) is a radio station broadcasting an adult contemporary format. Serving the Grinnell, Iowa, United States, area, the station is owned and operated by Alpha Media, through licensee Alpha Media Licensee LLC, and features local oriented programming with news, weather, sports, ag-related programming, and AC music.

References

External links

GRN
Radio stations established in 1957
1957 establishments in Iowa
Alpha Media radio stations